Matilda Friend (born 30 August 1999) is an Australian former competitive ice dancer. With her skating partner, William Badaoui, she is the 2016 Australian national champion and represented Australia at five Four Continents Figure Skating Championships.

Career
Early in her career, Friend skated with Patrick Adderley. They won two Australian junior titles.

By the 2014–15 season, Friend had teamed up with William Badaoui. The two debuted on the ISU Junior Grand Prix (JGP) series and won the first of their three junior national titles.

In 2015–16, Friend/Badaoui returned to the JGP series and also made their senior international debut at the Open d'Andorra, in November 2015. They then competed at their first ISU Championships, placing 16th at the 2016 Four Continents Championships, held in February in Taiwan, and 30th at the 2016 World Junior Championships, which took place in March in Hungary.

Friend/Badaoui took the Australian national senior title in the 2016–17 season. They finished 15th at the 2017 Four Continents Championships in South Korea and 25th at the 2017 World Junior Championships in Taiwan.

The duo competed at three more Four Continents, placing 14th in 2018, 12th in 2019, and 15th in 2020.

They trained at Macquarie Ice Rink under 1988 Winter Olympian Monica MacDonald.

Programs
with Badaoui

Competitive highlights

With Badaoui 
CS: Challenger Series; JGP: Junior Grand Prix

With Adderley

References 

Australian female ice dancers
1999 births
Living people
Competitors at the 2019 Winter Universiade
Figure skaters from Sydney
Figure skaters at the 2017 Asian Winter Games